Lucius Valerius Flaccus was a consul of the Roman Republic in 261 BC with Titus Otacilius Crassus.  He was possibly the ancestor of all later consuls by that name, since he marks the first appearance of a Lucius Valerius Flaccus on the list of consuls. 
He and his consular colleague waged war in Sicily. During his consulship the first Roman fleet of war boats were created after Carthaginian example. In 260, this fleet was ready.

References

Roman patricians
3rd-century BC Roman consuls
Flaccus, Lucius